Iris Rainer Dart ( Rainer; born March 3, 1944) is an American author and playwright for television and the stage. Her most notable novel is Beaches, which was made into a 1988 film of the same name. She has also written several stage musicals as well as for television shows, such as The Sonny and Cher Show.  She also voiced Donna, Peter Cottontail's love interest, in the 1971 stop-motion Easter classic, Here Comes Peter Cottontail.

Early life 
Dart was born in Pittsburgh, Pennsylvania, and was an actress as a youth with the Curtaineers, an inter-racial theater group at the Settlement house, at the Pittsburgh Playhouse, and The White Barn Theatre. She also went to classes at the Pittsburgh Playhouse as a child. She graduated from Taylor Allderdice High School in 1962 and was inducted into their alumni hall of fame in 2009. She is also a graduate of Carnegie Mellon University with a degree in theater.

Career 
In an interview (Summer 2007), when asked the question: "Has the Jewish cultural dynamic in your upbringing influenced what and how you write?", Dart replied "Unquestionably. I grew up in a household where both my parents were immigrants – my mother from Russia, father from Lithuania – and they spoke more Yiddish in my house than English, so it was just a [sic] completely a part of who I was."

Dart has written nine novels, including Beaches. She wrote for The Sonny and Cher Show variety show in the 1970s. She got the idea to write about a woman "loosely based on 'the no holds barred outrageous person' that she found in Cher. The character became "Cee Cee Bloom" in her ...novel Beaches later made into the iconic film of the same name starring Bette Midler."

She wrote the book and lyrics for the 2009 stage musical, Laughing Matters, for the Pasadena Playhouse, California. Her next work was the Roundabout Theatre Broadway production of her new musical, The People in the Picture, which opened on April 28, 2011, and closed on June 19, 2011, and starred Donna Murphy.

Personal life 
She was married to rock concert promoter Steve Wolf until they divorced in 1977 (less than half a year before he was murdered when robbers broke into his house). She is currently married to Stephen Dart, a California businessman. She has two adult children, a son (by Wolf) and a daughter (by Dart), and two grandchildren.

Bibliography 
Source: Fiction Database
The Boys in the Mailroom (1980)
Beaches (1985)
Til the Real Thing Comes Along (1987)
I'll Be There (republished as Beaches 2: I'll Be There) (1991)
The Stork Club (1992)
Show Business Kills (1995)
When I Fall in Love (1999)
Some Kind of Miracle (2003)

References

External links 

American romantic fiction writers
American women novelists
Living people
Carnegie Mellon University College of Fine Arts alumni
20th-century American novelists
Women romantic fiction writers
20th-century American women writers
1944 births
Taylor Allderdice High School alumni